Boana jimenezi is a species of frog in the family Hylidae that is endemic to Venezuela.

References

Boana
Amphibians of Venezuela
Endemic fauna of Venezuela
Taxa named by Josefa Celsa Señaris
Taxa named by José Ayarzagüena
Amphibians described in 2006